Richard Leroy Logan (May 4, 1930 – November 27, 2016) was an American football player.  He played college football at Ohio State University and professionally in the National Football League (NFL) with the Green Bay Packers.  Logan was drafted in the 11th round of the 1952 NFL Draft by the Cleveland Browns.

Biography
Logan was born in 1930 in Mansfield, Ohio.

See also
 List of Green Bay Packers players

References

1930 births
2016 deaths
American football offensive guards
Green Bay Packers players
Ohio State Buckeyes football players
San Diego Toreros football coaches
Sportspeople from Mansfield, Ohio
Players of American football from Ohio